Scinax exiguus is a species of frog in the family Hylidae. It is found in the Gran Sabana of Venezuela and in the Roraima state of the adjacent northern Brazil, as far south as Boa Vista, Roraima. Common name Gran Sabana snouted treefrog has been coined for it.

Description
Adult males measure  and adult females  in snout–vent length. The body is slender and the head is much longer than it is wide. The snout is subacuminate in dorsal view and acuminate in profile. The tympanum is distinct. The fingers have basal webbing whereas the toes are half-webbed; both bear subtruncate discs at the tips of the digits. The coloration varies by time of day. At night, the dorsum is pale yellowish tan and displays darker tan markings and cream dorsolateral stripes. Some individuals have a dark middorsal line. The belly is cream. By day, the dorsum becomes brown with dark brown stripes on the body and transverse bars on the limbs. The venter is dull cream. The iris is grayish bronze and has a median horizontal reddish brown streak. Males have yellow vocal sac.

Habitat and conservation
Males call from grasses, and a couple in amplexus has been found in a bush about 1 meter above water. The tadpoles develop in shallow pools.

Scinax exiguus is a common species that is not facing significant threats. It might occur in the Canaima National Park.

References

exiguus
Amphibians of Brazil
Amphibians of Venezuela
Taxa named by William Edward Duellman
Amphibians described in 1986
Taxonomy articles created by Polbot